Steve Berry, Steven Berry or Stephen Berry may refer to:

Stephen Berry
 R. Stephen Berry (1931–2020), emeritus chemistry professor at the University of Chicago
 Stephen Berry (journalist) (born 1948), American investigative journalist
 Stephen Berry (politician) (born 1983), New Zealand politician

Steve Berry
 Steve Berry (novelist) (born 1955), American novelist
 Steve Berry (footballer) (born 1963), English footballer
 Steve Berry (presenter) (born 1964), presenter of BBC TV show Top Gear
 Steve Berry (Vermont politician), member of the Vermont House of Representatives

Steven Berry
 S. Torriano Berry (Steven Torriano Berry, born 1958), American film producer, writer and director
 Steven T. Berry (born 1959), professor of economics at Yale